Solomon Airlines is the national airline of Solomon Islands, based in Honiara.

History 
Solomon Airlines was established in 1962 as a charter airline by Laurie Crowley. Crowley had a charter operation in Papua New Guinea with occasional charter flights to the Solomons using a single Piper Aztec. As no commercial aircraft were based in the Solomon Islands, Crowley decided to start an airline and called it Megapode Airlines.

Papua New Guinea-based Macair purchased Megapode in 1968, and changed the airline's name to Solomon Islands Airways, with the acronym of SOLAIR, and changed the operation from a charter airline to a regular schedule. Under Macair, SOLAIR served the island of Bougainville, Papua New Guinea, with two De Havilland Doves and two Beechcraft Barons.

In 1975, Macair (including its SOLAIR subsidiary) were bought by Talair, and in 1976, the airline received two Beechcraft Queen Air 80 airplanes. At the time, Solomon Islands Government bought 49 percent of the airline's shares and with rights to purchase the remaining 51 percent by the next five years.

For the next five years, growth was slow but steady. A brand new Fairchild Swearingen Metroliner was bought, and services were established to Vanuatu.

In 1984 the Government decided to purchase all of the airline's remaining shares, and two De Havilland Canada DHC-6 Twin Otters and one Embraer EMB 110 Bandeirante were leased from Talair. Soon after full Government take-over, the three leased planes were returned. In 1987, the sale of the airline and its assets Pacific Car Rental (a subsidiary of Avis) and the tour company Hunts of the Pacific, were completed.

The new ownership was met with skepticism and distrust by airline workers, and many trained personnel left the company, including some on the managerial level. The government was faced with the task of rebuilding the airline, and it started doing so by investing 2 million dollars to buy two DHC-6-300 Twin Otters. Soon, a new livery was introduced, and the name was changed to "Solomon Airlines" officially.

A joint venture with Qantas followed, and then Solomon Airlines entered the jet age by leasing a Boeing 737 from Air Pacific. Solomon Airlines and Air Pacific soon also made a joint venture, but when Air Pacific announced in 1989 it was planning to substitute its Boeing 737 with a Boeing 767 to upgrade international services, Solomon Airlines was forced to lease one from another company, and so it decided on leasing a 737 owned by International Lease Finance Corporation. Since then, the airline has operated with leased 737s alongside its own turbo-props.

In 1999, after ethnic violence broke out in the Solomons, the United Nations imposed sanctions which severely damaged the airline's international operations, and at one point, the airline was forced to retain only is scheduled services to Brisbane. Since the end of the conflict, the airline has reestablished its international network.

In November 2006, Solomon Airlines obtained a Boeing B737-300 aircraft including pilots and cabin crew, leased by the Spanish AirClass Airways.

For the months of January and February 2009, Solomon Airlines leased a De Havilland Canada Dash 8 seating 40, from Vincent Aviation of Wellington, New Zealand while one of its Twin Otter aircraft was undergoing heavy maintenance at Honiara.

In August 2009, Solomon Airlines obtained an Airbus A320-200 aircraft including pilots, leased by Strategic Airlines. When the lease with Strategic Airlines expired Solomon Airlines acquired an Airbus A320-211 and obtained its own Air Operators Certificate.

On 7 June 2016 Solomon Airlines suspended all operations, including international and domestic flights and ground operations, stranding passengers at Honiara. The airline's CEO, Ron Sum Sum, said that the grounding was caused by the government's failure to pay millions of dollars in arrears. The airline resumed operations two days later.

Destinations

Solomon Airlines currently operates regular return services from Honiara to Brisbane-Australia, Nadi-Fiji (own aircraft & codeshare), Port Vila, Vanuatu (own aircraft & codeshare), Port Moresby, Papua New Guinea (codeshare only), and Tarawa, Kiribati.

Solomon Airlines also operates an extensive domestic network around the Solomon Islands.

Livery 
The airline's original livery consisted of an overall white fuselage, with a cheatline extending up onto the vertical fin in colors mirroring those of the national flag.  The vertical fin was mainly royal blue, with five white stars prominently displayed.  The single word "Solomons" was carried above the window line forward, along with the national flag.

With the acquisition of the Airbus A320 in 2011 a decision was made to "refresh" the livery. The new livery consists of an all-white fuselage with the single word "Solomons" carried above the forward windows and "Spirit of Solomons" in grey below the forward window line. The tail and winglets have a stylised version of the national flag. The underside of the fuselage has a large white flysolomons.com on a blue background.

Fleet 
	

, the Solomon Airlines fleet comprises the following aircraft:

Historical fleet
In the past, Solomon Airlines operated:
Boeing 737-200
Boeing 737-300
Boeing 737-400
Embraer 170

Codeshare agreements
Solomon Airlines has codeshare agreements with the following airlines:

 Air Kiribati
 Air Niugini
 Air Vanuatu
 Fiji Airways
 Qantas

Accidents 
Solomon Airlines have lost two aircraft during their history. These were a BN-2A Islander in 1978 near Bellona Island and a DH6 Twin Otter in 1991 over Guadalcanal, resulting in 26 fatalities.

References

External links

Solomon Airlines
Solomon Airlines UK

Airlines of the Solomon Islands
Airlines established in 1962
Government-owned airlines
1962 establishments in the United Kingdom